is a Japanese boxer. He competed in the men's featherweight event at the 1964 Summer Olympics. At the 1964 Summer Olympics, he defeated Ian McLoughlin of Northern Rhodesia, before losing to Piotr Gutman of Poland.

References

1945 births
Living people
Japanese male boxers
Olympic boxers of Japan
Boxers at the 1964 Summer Olympics
Sportspeople from Tokyo
Asian Games medalists in boxing
Boxers at the 1966 Asian Games
Asian Games bronze medalists for Japan
Medalists at the 1966 Asian Games
Featherweight boxers
20th-century Japanese people